Bernardino Belluzzi (27 October 1642 – 15 February 1719) was a Roman Catholic prelate who served as Bishop of Camerino (1702–1719)
and Bishop of Montefeltro (1678–1702).

Biography
Bernardino Belluzzi was born in San Marin de Montefeltro, Italy on 27 October 1642 and ordained a priest on 14 August 1678.
On 5 September 1678, he was appointed during the papacy of Pope Innocent XI as Bishop of Montefeltro.
On 18 September 1678, he was consecrated bishop by Alessandro Crescenzi (cardinal), Bishop of Recanati e Loreto, with Domenico Gianuzzi, Titular Bishop of Dioclea in Phrygia, and Bartolomeo Menatti, Bishop of Lodi, serving as co-consecrators. 
On 25 September 1702, he was appointed during the papacy of Pope Gregory XIII as Bishop of Camerino.
He served as Bishop of Camerino until his death on 15 February 1719.

References

External links and additional sources
 (for Chronology of Bishops) 
 (for Chronology of Bishops) 
 (for Chronology of Bishops) 
 (for Chronology of Bishops) 

18th-century Italian Roman Catholic bishops
Bishops appointed by Pope Innocent XI
1642 births
1719 deaths
17th-century Italian Roman Catholic bishops